Kajiki may refer to:
Kajiki, Kagoshima
 Kajiki Station
Typhoon Kajiki
Kajiki Ryota

See also 
Marlin - translated to Kajiki in Japanese